The Alligator Lake volcanic complex is a group of basaltic cinder cones and lava flows in south central Yukon. The upper part of the Alligator Lake volcanic complex consists of two well-preserved cinder cones capping a small shield volcano. They probably post-date the local Holocene glaciation. Lava flows from both cinder cones traveled to the north and were erupted simultaneously. Their compositions range from alkali olivine basalt to basanitic.

The volcanic complex was named by the nearby Alligator Lake.

See also
List of Northern Cordilleran volcanoes
List of volcanoes in Canada
Volcanic history of the Northern Cordilleran Volcanic Province
Volcanism of Canada

References

Cinder cones of Canada
Volcanoes of Yukon
Northern Cordilleran Volcanic Province
Holocene volcanoes
Shield volcanoes of Canada
Volcanic fields of Canada